The barber paradox is a puzzle derived from Russell's paradox. It was used by Bertrand Russell as an illustration of the paradox, though he attributes it to an unnamed person who suggested it to him. The puzzle shows that an apparently plausible scenario is logically impossible. Specifically, it describes a barber who is defined such that he both shaves himself and does not shave himself, which implies that no such barber exists.

Paradox 

The barber is the "one who shaves all those, and those only, who do not shave themselves". The question is, does the barber shave himself?

Any answer to this question results in a contradiction: The barber cannot shave himself, as he only shaves those who do not shave themselves. Thus, if he shaves himself he ceases to be the barber specified. Conversely, if the barber does not shave himself, then he fits into the group of people who would be shaved by the specified barber, and thus, as that barber, he must shave himself.

In its original form, this paradox has no solution, as no such barber can exist. The question is a loaded question in that it assumes the existence of a barber who could not exist, which is a vacuous proposition, and hence false. There are other non-paradoxical variations, but those are different.

History 

This paradox is often incorrectly attributed to Bertrand Russell (e.g., by Martin Gardner in Aha!). It was suggested to Russell as an alternative form of Russell's paradox, which Russell had devised to show that set theory as it was used by Georg Cantor and Gottlob Frege contained contradictions. However, Russell denied that the Barber's paradox was an instance of his own:

This point is elaborated further under Applied versions of Russell's paradox.

In first-order logic 

 

This sentence says that a barber  exists. Its truth value is false, as the existential clause is unsatisfiable (a contradiction) because of the universal quantifier . The universally quantified  will include every single element in the domain, including our infamous barber . Since the sentence is false for that particular value, the entire universal clause is false. Since the existential clause is a conjunction with one operand that is false, the entire sentence is false. Another way to show this is to negate the entire sentence and arrive at a tautology. Nobody is a barber, so there is no solution to the paradox.

See also 
 Cantor's theorem
 Gödel's incompleteness theorems
 Halting problem
 List of paradoxes
 Double bind

References

External links 
 Proposition of the Barber's Paradox
 Joyce, Helen. "Mathematical mysteries: The Barber's Paradox". Plus, May 2002.
 Edsger Dijkstra's take on the problem
 
 Russell's (Barber) paradox explanation in Python

Self-referential paradoxes
Bertrand Russell
Logical paradoxes